UBV may mean:

 UBV photometric system, (or Johnson photometric system) in astronomy
 Universidad Bolivariana de Venezuela, Bolivarian University of Venezuela